Paulo Pezzolano (born 25 April 1983) is a Uruguayan football manager and former player who played as an attacking midfielder.

Career
Pezzolano comes from the capital city of Montevideo and is a graduate of the local team C.A. Rentistas, were for the senior team he was involved in the age of 18. His team was relegated to the Second Division after a poor season in 2001. He spent the next two years, after which he returned with his team to the First División.

In 2006, he spent in the Brazilian Atlético Paranaense, but after 6 months, he returned to his native country, signing an agreement with Defensor Sporting. In the 2006–07 season he took a decisive role with his team to get the 3rd place in the league and to get to the quarter-finals of the 2007 Copa Libertadores.

In July 2007, Pezzolano signed with Uruguayan giant C.A. Peñarol. But six months later he joined Liverpool Montevideo, scoring a hat-trick in his debut against Central Español. In his first season (Clausura 2008) with the team, he was the top scorer of the tournament, scoring 12 goals in 14 meetings.  A year later came up with Liverpool FC in the Copa Sudamericana, but they fall in 1/16 finals.

In August 2009, Pezzolano went on loan to Spanish team R.C.D. Mallorca. He made his La Liga debut on September 19, 2009 meeting with the 4-0 win against Tenerife. Overall, in the 2009–2010 season he played 12 matches in Mallorca, but only one in the starting composition, a team led by Gregorio Manzano took 5th place in the league table.

Pezzolano was transferred to Chinese Super League side Hangzhou Greentown in January 2011. He made his Chinese Super League debut on 1 April 2011 against Nanchang Hengyuan F.C., scoring one goal.

In early January 2012, he joined Liga de Ascenso side Club Necaxa.

In July 2012, he returned to his home city to play for the second time in his career with Liverpool Montevideo. In his match return, he scored a penalty  goal against Universitario playing the Copa Sudamericana.

In February 2016, he joined CA Torque on a free transfer he spent a season with them before retiring on 27 November 2016 and taking the managerial position for the next season.

In January 2022, after last managing Mexican side Pachuca, Pezzolano signed a one-year deal to be Cruzeiro's first head coach after the team's sale to Ronaldo. He led the club to a promotion to the Série A as champions, but left on 19 March 2023.

Managerial statistics

References

External links
 
 
 

1983 births
Living people
Uruguayan footballers
Uruguayan expatriate footballers
Association football midfielders
Uruguayan Primera División players
Chinese Super League players
La Liga players
C.A. Rentistas players
Liverpool F.C. (Montevideo) players
Defensor Sporting players
Peñarol players
Club Athletico Paranaense players
RCD Mallorca players
Zhejiang Professional F.C. players
Club Necaxa footballers
Montevideo City Torque players
Expatriate footballers in Brazil
Uruguayan expatriate sportspeople in Brazil
Expatriate footballers in China
Uruguayan expatriate sportspeople in China
Expatriate footballers in Mexico
Uruguayan expatriate sportspeople in Mexico
Expatriate footballers in Spain
Uruguayan expatriate sportspeople in Spain
Uruguayan sportspeople of Italian descent
Montevideo City Torque managers
Liverpool F.C. (Montevideo) managers
Uruguayan football managers
Cruzeiro Esporte Clube managers
Uruguayan expatriate football managers